Willie Mataka (born 18 October 1988) is a former Tonga rugby league footballer who last played for the Mount Pritchard Mounties in the New South Wales Cup.  He played mostly as a  forward.

Background
Mataka played junior football with the East Campbelltown Eagles.

Playing career
Mataka joined the Sydney Roosters in 2011, and made 2 appearances that year.

Mataka joined the Parramatta Eels in 2012, but failed to make a first grade appearance.

Mataka joined the St. George Illawarra Dragons in 2014, but failed to make a first Grade appearance.

In 2015, he joined the Mount Pritchard Mounties.

Career highlights
First Grade Debut: 2009 - Round 10, Wests Tigers vs Rabbitohs, 17 May.

References

External links
Willie Mataka at Weststigers.com.au

1988 births
Australian rugby league players
Wests Tigers players
Tonga national rugby league team players
Australian sportspeople of Tongan descent
Balmain Ryde-Eastwood Tigers players
Western Suburbs Magpies NSW Cup players
Illawarra Cutters players
Sydney Roosters players
Rugby league second-rows
Rugby league locks
Rugby league centres
Living people